Jadet Meelarp (born January 17, 1972), simply known as Sir Det, is a Thai football manager who is currently the head coach of Thai League 2 club Customs Ladkrabang United and who is currently the technical consultant of Thailand U-23.

Managerial career
Jadet took over the role from Thai footballer and manager Withaya Laohakul who went on to coach in Japan. Jadet led Chonburi in their first season in Asian competition, overcoming a strong Melbourne Victory outfit 3-1 in a game played in Bangkok. In 2017 Jadet became manager of Port after their former manager, Kiatisak Senamuang, resigned. In 2018 he got new footballers: Dragan Boskovic, Nurul Sriyankem, Kim Sung-Hwan, Terens Puhiri, Kevin Deeromram and Worawut Namvech.

Managerial statistics

Honours

Manager
Chonburi
Thailand Premier League (1): 2007
Thai FA Cup (1): 2010
Kor Royal Cup (2): 2007, 2011
Muangkan United
 Thai League 3 Runners-up (1): 2020–21

Individual
Thailand Premier League Coach of the Year (1): 2007
Thailand Premier League Coach of the Month (5): May 2010, August 2010, August 2015, February 2018, April 2019

References

External links
Jadet Meelarp at Goal

1972 births
Living people
Jadet Meelarp
Jadet Meelarp
Jadet Meelarp
Pattaya United F.C. managers
Jadet Meelarp
Jadet Meelarp
Jadet Meelarp